Contoderus hamaticollis is a species of beetle in the family Cerambycidae, and the only species in the genus Contoderus. It was described by Pascoe in 1859.

References

Acanthocinini
Beetles described in 1859
Monotypic Cerambycidae genera